Jéssica Sayonara Maier (born ) is a Brazilian group rhythmic gymnast. She represents her nation at international competitions. She competed at world championships, including at the 2015  World Rhythmic Gymnastics Championships.

See also
List of Olympic rhythmic gymnasts for Brazil

References

1994 births
Living people
Brazilian rhythmic gymnasts
Place of birth missing (living people)
Gymnasts at the 2015 Pan American Games
Pan American Games gold medalists for Brazil
Pan American Games silver medalists for Brazil
Pan American Games medalists in gymnastics
Olympic gymnasts of Brazil
South American Games medalists in gymnastics
South American Games gold medalists for Brazil
Medalists at the 2015 Pan American Games
Gymnasts at the 2016 Summer Olympics
20th-century Brazilian women
21st-century Brazilian women